WP:SE
Sororin is a protein that in humans is encoded by the CDCA5 gene.

Function
Sororin is required for stable binding of cohesin to chromatin and for sister chromatid cohesion in interphase.

Clinical significance
Transactivation of Sororin and its phosphorylation at Ser209 by ERK play an important role in lung cancer proliferation.

References

Further reading

External links